Redfern was an electoral district of the Legislative Assembly in the Australian state of New South Wales, created in 1880, and named after and including the Sydney suburb of Redfern. It extended to Botany Bay and was bordered by Rainbow Street (Redfern), Anzac Parade, the southern edge of Moore Park, South Dowling Street, Cleveland Street, City Road, King Street (Newtown), Alexandra Canal and Cooks River. It elected two members from 1880 to 1882, three members from 1882 to 1887 and four members from 1887 until the abolition of multi-member electorates in 1894, when it was split into Redfern, Botany, Darlington, Waterloo and part of Newtown-Erskine. In 1920, with the introduction of proportional representation, it was absorbed into Botany. It was recreated in 1927 and abolished in 1968.

Members for Redfern

Election results

References

Former electoral districts of New South Wales
Constituencies established in 1880
1880 establishments in Australia
Constituencies disestablished in 1920
1920 disestablishments in Australia
Constituencies established in 1927
1927 establishments in Australia
Constituencies disestablished in 1968
1968 disestablishments in Australia